Udórz  is a village in the administrative district of Gmina Żarnowiec within Zawiercie County, Silesian Voivodeship in southern Poland.

References

Villages in Zawiercie County